Rajalakshmi Jayaram was an Indian Cine- Theatre actress who acted prominently in Malayalam films.

Filmography 
The first movie of Rajalakshmi is Bhoomiyile Malakha as heroine and Prem Nazir is the hero of the film. She has acted also in Kaliyodam and Mayavi Malayalam movies

Personal life
Rajalakshmi was the heroine of all the major plays of Deshabhimani Theaters. Rajalakshmi married late D Jayaram, the former chairman of Kottayam Attingal Municipal Council. After the marriage she left acting. They have two sons, C. J. Rajeshkumar, the former chairman of Attingal Municipal Council and C. J. Girishkumar.

Death
Rajalakshmi died in her 82nd year on 18 October 2021.

References

External links
 Rajalakshmi Senior
 Rajalakshmi (82) passed away

1930s births
2021 deaths
Actresses in Malayalam cinema
Indian film actresses